Mazzano is a comune in the province of Brescia, in Lombardy, northern Italy.
The Municipality of Mazzano has a population of 12500 inhabitants and consists of three hamlets, Mazzano, Molinetto and Ciliverghe

Twin towns
Mazzano is twinned with:

  Saint-Germain-des-Fossés, France

The Municipality of Mazzano is twinned with the French town of Saint-Germain-des-Fossés, located in the Allier (Auvergne), ten kilometers from Vichy. The oath of brotherhood that sanctioned the formalization of the twinning was held in October 2002 in Saint-Germain-des-Fossés and on April 25, 2003 in Mazzano.
Since 2010 the municipal administration, led by the mayor Maurizio Franzoni, has no longer considered continuing relations with the French citizen without confirming the municipal commission for twinning.

Sports

Alpine regularity race

Starting from 1986 in Mazzano there is a regularity march in the mountains of the FIE (Italian Hiking Federation) called Renato Malossi trophy in honor of the historical leader of the Alpine group.

The competition is organized by the Alpine Sports Directorate of Mazzano under the aegis of the Italian Hiking Federation and is sponsored by the Municipality of Mazzano and the Province of Brescia.

In the 34 previous editions, the race was a regional championship race and on some occasions an Italian championship race. Combined with the same gear is the Boioni and Cerqui cups for the youth and student sector and the Comune di Mazzano trophy awarded to the winners of the promotional race in pairs.

In 2019 the race was held on March 17 starting from the Mazzano Alpini's house

Football

A.S.D.P. Ciliverghe di Mazzano is the football team of the city. It plays in Italy's Serie D after the promotion from Eccellenza Lombardy Girone C in the 2013–14 season.

References

Cities and towns in Lombardy